Penny Pulz (born 2 February 1953) is an Australian professional golfer who played on the LPGA Tour.

Pulz won twice on the LPGA Tour in 1979 and 1986.

LPGA Tour wins (2)

LPGA Tour playoff record (0–2)

Team appearances
Amateur
Tasman Cup (representing Australia): 1972 (winners)

References

External links

Australian female golfers
LPGA Tour golfers
Golfers from Melbourne
Sportswomen from Victoria (Australia)
1953 births
Living people